Vellala Sathyam was a Kannada writer and poet based in Bangalore. He has written many novels in Kannada, one of them being Mahaatyaagi, based on Charles Dickens' A Tale of Two Cities. His other novel, Dr.Srinath is based on H.G.Wells' The Invisible Man.
Nilambari is based on Wilkie Collins novel The Woman In White and 'Chintamani' is based on same author's The Moonstone.

In addition he has indianized many Sir Arthur Conan Doyle's Sherlock Holmes mysteries. Sherlock Holmes becomes Rao and Watson becomes Sathyam.

Vellala Sathyam had an ability to Indianize the western novels.

Works 
 Nilambari
 Chintamani or Shaapada Vajra
 Muttabeda Joke
 Shista Chatustaya
 Maha Prayoga
 Sallapa
 Sringara Lahari
 Mahaatyaagi
 Dr.Srinath
 Onde Rathriyalli
 Mrityu Sandesha mattu Sarpastra
 Sanchu mattu Koleyadavaru yaaru
 Mrityu Samputa
 Sudhamayi
 Kempina Motte
 Sanchu
 Kempina Motte mattu Ashubhasya sheeghram
 Sringara Rasaraatrigalu
 Sookti Sudha

Adaptations of novels in cinema
 Digbandana – A Kannada movie released on 2002 based on Onde Rathriyalli

See also 
 Nissar Ahmed

References 

Kannada-language writers
Writers from Bangalore
20th-century Indian novelists
Indian male novelists
Year of birth missing
Year of death missing
Novelists from Karnataka
20th-century Indian male writers